Freaked is a 1993 American comedy film directed by Tom Stern and Alex Winter, both of whom wrote the screenplay with Tim Burns. Winter also starred in the lead role. Both were involved in the short-lived MTV sketch comedy show The Idiot Box, and Freaked retains the same brand of surrealistic and absurdist humor as seen in the show. Freaked was Alex Winter's last feature film before he shifted to cameo and television films for many years until 2013's Grand Piano.

Originally conceived as a low-budget horror film featuring the band Butthole Surfers, Freaked went through a number of rewrites, eventually developing into a black comedy set within a sideshow, which was picked up by 20th Century Fox for a feature film. After several poor test screenings and a change in studio executives who then found the film too "weird", the film was pulled from a wide distribution (except for Australia and Japan) and only played on two screens in the United States.

Plot

Skye Daley (Brooke Shields) is interviewing former child star Ricky Coogin (Alex Winter). Skye asks how Ricky so quickly went from one of America's sweethearts to a name that makes children scream in terror. Ricky, completely in silhouette, begins his story.

Ricky is shown accepting an endorsement contract from slimy mega-corporation E.E.S. (Everything Except Shoes) to promote "Zygrot 24", a toxic fertilizer, in South America. Although hesitant at first, the greedy, self-centered Coogin caves in after CEO (William Sadler) offers him $5,000,000. Ricky travels to the South American town of "Santa Flan" with his friend Ernie (Michael Stoyanov). During their flight, the duo have a run-in with Ricky's 12-year-old fan Stuey Gluck (Alex Zuckerman). Stuey begs Ricky not to promote Zygrot 24 only to accidentally fall out of the plane.

Once Ricky and Ernie arrive in Santa Flan, they cross paths with a group of environmentalists protesting Zygrot 24 and Ricky. In the group is Julie (Megan Ward), who Ricky becomes instantly smitten with. The two con Julie into thinking they're also environmentalists, with Ricky posing as a highly injured accident victim, his face covered in bandages, and she agrees to join them on a trip to another protest. However, she soon finds out their true identities and the three are stuck with each other for the rest of the drive. They decide to take a detour to see Freek Land, a local freak show, only to wind up in the clutches of demented proprietor and mad scientist Elijah C. Skuggs (Randy Quaid) and his henchman, Toad (Jaime Cardriche). Utilizing his "Tasty Freeks Machine", he merges Julie and Ernie into conjoined twins and turns Ricky into a hideous green mutation. Elijah runs out of Zygrot, resulting in only half of Ricky's body being mutated.

Ricky meets the other freaks, including Ortiz the Dog Boy (Keanu Reeves), Worm (Derek McGrath) a giant arthropod, Cowboy (John Hawkes) a literal anthropomorphic cow, the Bearded Lady (Mr. T in a dress) and Sockhead (Bobcat Goldthwait), who has a sock puppet for a head. Ricky has trouble adjusting to his new life as a freak, though he opens up when some of the other freaks recount how they were captured and disfigured by Elijah. During his first performance, Ricky foregoes his originally intended act and performs a Shakespearean monologue which captivates the audience. Spotting an EES agent in the crowd, Ricky jumps off the stage hoping to be rescued, but flies into a murderous rage when the agent mocks him and his appearance. Ricky tears his agent's head off and the crowd runs screaming into the night, with an amused Elijah simply noting "that's what I call entertainment."

The next day, Ricky discovers to his horror that he is seeing a floating specter of Stuey. He angrily shoos Stuey's astral form away, but Cowboy states that only a pair of soulmates can have such a strong telepathic bond. After multiple failed attempts to sell the story to newspapers Stuey manages to sell Ricky's story to the Weekly World News, but ends up being captured by a group of businessmen that work for E.E.S.

Ricky tries to escape by stealing the outfit of a milkman, only to be captured by the Rastafar-eyes, Skuggs's gun-toting Rastafarian eyeball henchmen and brought before Elijah. Skuggs tells Ricky he plans to have him fully-mutated into a blood-thirsty monster who will kill all the other freaks at the next show. On his way back to the freaks shed, he runs into the other freaks also making an escape attempt, all dressed as milkmen. Ricky butts heads with Ortiz and the two fight until Ortiz is distracted by a squirrel and runs off, the Rastafar-eyes in pursuit. With Ortiz gone, Ricky is named the new freaks leader. Ricky and the freaks break into Skuggs's lab to create a serum that will complete Ricky's mutation and have him kill Skuggs instead of the freaks. Ricky accidentally leaves the concoction in the lab, but finds a bag of macaroons which the freaks enjoy.

Ricky eventually finds out that E.E.S. has been supplying Elijah's with Zygrot, and they arrive at Freek Land with a new shipment and an imprisoned Stuey Gluck. As they discuss their plans to mutate the world's population into a race of E.E.S. workers and consumers, Stuey follows a telepathic tip from Ricky and manages to escape, grabbing the coffee can of mutation goo left behind by Ricky along the way.

On the night of the show, Stuey appears with the batch of Zygrot only to have an annoyed biker dump it onto him, which turns him into a grotesque seven-foot monster. Stuey kills the biker and prepares to storm the stage and save Ricky. The Rastafar-eyes attempt to kill Stuey but he kicks dust into their eyes, blinding them. Toad tries to attack Stuey only for Julie and Ernie to throw an M80 onto Toad's tongue which he swallows and promptly explodes. In response, Elijah infects Ricky with his own Zygrot, fully turning him into an equally grotesque seven-foot monster. As Ricky and Stuey battle to the death onstage, Elijah discovers the E.E.S. executives betraying him and trying to steal his equipment with the aid of their agents. A furious Elijah stops them by soaking them all with a Zygrot bazooka; reducing them all into a large puddle of primordial goop which then mutates and reforms into a giant, fleshy shoe.

Right before Ricky is about to destroy Stuey, Cowboy reminds him that Stuey is his soulmate. A wave of compassion comes over him, and he gives Stuey a hug. Enraged, Elijah unsuccessfully tries to fight Ricky, who also bashes him in the head, breaking his spine. Skuggs tries to get Ricky not to kill him by offering him the antidote for his mutation, telling him it was a time-delayed serum baked into a batch of macaroons. Ricky comments that he skimped on the coconut and punches Skuggs, tossing him into the vat of Zygrot 24. An FBI task force arrives to save Ricky after having learned of Stuey's article. Skuggs suddenly reemerges from the Vat, having taken the form of Skye Daley. The FBI task force guns Skuggs/Skye down.

Back at the interview, it's revealed that Ricky has returned to normal (along with most of the other freaks, except for Worm, who hates Macaroons). They are then joined by Ortiz who has finally caught the squirrel and Stuey, still a giant super-freak. Skye comments on Elijah mutating to look like her, and Ricky realizes that Skye actually is Elijah. Skuggs lunges after Ricky with a machete, only to be gunned down by the now normal Julie. As she embraces Ricky, Skye rises again, this time to be gunned down by Ernie. Ricky and Julie kiss and everyone waves farewell to the audience until the film ends on a frozen shot of Skuggs once again rising up to attack.

Cast
 Alex Winter as Ricky Coogin
 Michael Stoyanov as Ernie
 Megan Ward as Julie
 Randy Quaid as Elijah C. Skuggs
 Keanu Reeves as Ortiz "The Dog Boy" (uncredited)
 Mr. T as The Bearded Lady
Bobcat Goldthwait as "Sockhead"
 Derek McGrath as "Worm"
 Jeff Kahn as "Nosey"
 John Hawkes as "Cowboy"
 Jon M. Chu as Giant Stuey Monster
 Lee Arenberg as "The Human Flame"
 Patti Tippo as Rosie "The Pinhead"
 Tim Burns as "Frogman"
 Ray Baker as Bill Blazer
 Jaime Cardriche as "Toad"
 William Sadler as Dick Brian
 Alex Zuckerman as Stuey Gluck
 Brooke Shields as Skye Daley
 Michael Gilden and Joseph S. Griffo as "Eye N. Eye"
 Calvert DeForest (credited as Larry "Bud" Melman) as The President of the United States
 Morgan Fairchild as Pan Am Stewardess

Production
The film, under the working title of Hideous Mutant Freekz, was conceived around the time Winter and Stern had directed 1988's Bar-B-Que Movie, a short film starring and featuring the music of experimental rock band Butthole Surfers. Winter, Stern and Surfers frontman Gibby Haynes began work on the first draft of the script, envisioning it as an obscene, ultra-violent horror film once again featuring the Butthole Surfers, costing around $100,000. The idea was, as Alex Winter put it, "Beach Blanket Bingo meets The Evil Dead". The two fished the script around to various studios for years, but to no avail.

Following the end of production on Stern and Winter's MTV sketch comedy show The Idiot Box, co-writer Tim Burns was recruited to join the two in a number of rewrites. The film was completely revisioned, dropping the aspect of the Butthole Surfers entirely and turning it into a full comedy in the vein of the Monty Python and MAD Magazine-inspired humour that was present in The Idiot Box.

Winter and Stern pitched the idea to 20th Century Fox. Joe Roth, the head of the studio at that time, loved the idea and offered the two a twelve million dollar deal to direct it, despite the fact that neither of them had any experience directing a major Hollywood film and had never even shot on 35mm film before. The only condition was that the film had to be rewritten and toned down to fit a PG-13 rating; therefore, most of the profanity was written out of the final draft to fit MPAA standards. Within a month of being picked up, the film began production.

The makeup effects requirements for the film were so substantial, and the lead time before filming was so short, the makeup effects characters for the film were designed and created by three different companies: Tony Gardner's company Alterian, Inc., Steve Johnson's XFX, Inc., and Screaming Mad George's Studio.

20th Century Fox had such high expectations for the film that they released a number of products based on it, including a line of action figures, a novelization and, most notably, a comic book released by Hamilton Comics (however, since the comic was drawn before most of the casting was completed, none of its characters look anything like their real-life counterparts).  Four resin figures were sold at Spencer Gifts and Suncoast Motion Picture Company.

Complications
During filming, Joe Roth was fired as studio head by Rupert Murdoch and replaced with Peter Chernin, who didn't like the film nor the fact that twelve million dollars was being invested in it. Chernin cut the film's post-production budget, thus forcing a lot of the soundtrack (including a demo song that Iggy Pop had recorded for the closing credits) and special effects to be greatly cut down or eliminated altogether. The film's title was changed, as well, from the poorly received "Hideous Mutant Freekz" to the supposedly more accessible "Freaked", a title neither Winter nor Stern much cared for.

After several poor test screenings, Fox chose to pull the film from a nationwide release and cut its advertising budget, leaving no money for commercials or newspaper ads. Freaked had its official premiere at the Toronto International Film Festival on September 11, 1993. Despite initial positive critical response, the film opened October 3, 1993 in the United States on only two screens, making a mere $6,957 in its first weekend. It quickly dropped out of theatres, making less than $30,000 and becoming a failure at the box-office, and was released on VHS on April 20, 1994.

Reception
Freaked received a mostly mixed response from critics. Entertainment Weekly described the film as "having more laughs than a month of Saturday Night Live", The New York Times hailed it as one of the top comedies of the nineties, and John Kricfalusi, the creator of The Ren & Stimpy Show, called it "the funniest movie in years". The movie currently holds a 50% rating on Rotten Tomatoes based on 18 reviews.

Freaked eventually went on to win two awards: the Grand Prize at the 1995 Gérardmer Film Festival and Best Actor (for "The Creatures of the Film") at the 1994 Fantafestival. The film was also nominated for a Saturn Award for Best Make-up.

Home media
On July 12, 2005, Anchor Bay Entertainment and 20th Century Fox released a special-edition two-disc DVD, featuring extra material, including deleted scenes, audio commentary, behind-the-scenes footage and two short films from Alex Winter and Tom Stern, the 15-minute film noir parody Squeal Of Death and a black-and-white skit titled NYU Sight & Sound Project.

On August 6, 2013, Anchor Bay and Starz Inc. released the movie on  Blu-ray. The Blu-ray does not include any of the bonus features from the DVD release. Both the Blu-ray and DVD are out print and considered to be collectors items.

Soundtrack

A soundtrack release for Freaked was planned, but following the loss of their post-production budget, the idea never came to fruition. The score was composed by Kevin Kiner, with additional music by Paul Leary and Butthole Surfers, and Blind Idiot God. In 2020, Death Waltz Recording Co. released the soundtrack and score as a physical LP. The songs featured in the film were as follows:

"Freaked" - Henry Rollins and Blind Idiot God
"Gumby Jack Flash" - Paul Leary
"Rip/Stop" - Blind Idiot God
"Butter Queen" - Butthole Surfers
"Hideous Mutant Freekz" - Parliament Funkadelic and Bill Laswell
"Sweat Loaf" - Butthole Surfers
"Freekz! (That's What They Call Us!)" - Mark Evans, Mark Free, & Greg Welchel
"Midget Man Skank" - Blind Idiot God
"Cha Bump" - Bald Bill Hagan and His Trocaderons
"Gluehead Stomp" - Blind Idiot God
"'The Murder" (from Psycho) - Bernard Herrmann

References

External links
Official Freaked Facebook Page

Interview with David Daniels, creator of film's opening credits sequence

1990s science fiction comedy films
1990s black comedy films
1993 films
20th Century Fox films
American black comedy films
American body horror films
American science fiction comedy films
American parody films
Films directed by Alex Winter
Films scored by Kevin Kiner
Mad scientist films
Films using stop-motion animation
1993 directorial debut films
1993 comedy films
American monster movies
Films with screenplays by Alex Winter
1990s English-language films
1990s American films